A projectile is an object that is propelled by the application of an external force and then moves freely under the influence of gravity and air resistance. Although any objects in motion through space are projectiles, they are commonly found in warfare and sports (for example, a thrown baseball, kicked football, fired bullet, shot arrow, stone released from catapult).

In ballistics mathematical equations of motion are used to analyze projectile trajectories through launch, flight, and impact.

Motive force

Blowguns and pneumatic rifles use compressed gases, while most other guns and cannons utilize expanding gases liberated by sudden chemical reactions by propellants like smokeless powder. Light-gas guns use a combination of these mechanisms.

Railguns utilize electromagnetic fields to provide a constant acceleration along the entire length of the device, greatly increasing the muzzle velocity.

Some projectiles provide propulsion during flight by means of a rocket engine or jet engine. In military terminology, a rocket is unguided, while a missile is guided. Note the two meanings of "rocket" (weapon and engine): an ICBM is a guided missile with a rocket engine.

An explosion, whether or not by a weapon, causes the debris to act as multiple high velocity projectiles. An explosive weapon or device may also be designed to produce many high velocity projectiles by the break-up of its casing; these are correctly termed fragments.

In sports 

In projectile motion the most important force applied to the ‘projectile’ is the propelling force, in this case the propelling forces are the muscles that act upon the ball to make it move, and the stronger the force applied, the more propelling force, which means the projectile (the ball) will travel farther. See pitching, bowling.

As a weapon

Delivery projectiles
Many projectiles, e.g. shells, may carry an explosive charge or another chemical or biological substance. Aside from explosive payload, a projectile can be designed to cause special damage, e.g. fire (see also early thermal weapons), or poisoning (see also arrow poison).

Kinetic projectiles

Wired projectiles
Some projectiles stay connected by a cable to the launch equipment after launching it:
 for guidance: wire-guided missile (range up to )
 to administer an electric shock, as in the case of a Taser (range up to ); two projectiles are shot simultaneously, each with a cable.
 to make a connection with the target, either to tow it towards the launcher, as with a whaling harpoon, or to draw the launcher to the target, as a grappling hook does.

Typical projectile speeds

Equations of motion

An object projected at an angle to the horizontal has both the vertical and horizontal components of velocity. There are various calculations for projectiles at a specific angle :

1. Time to reach maximum height. Mathematically, it is given as  where  = acceleration due to gravity (app 9.81 m/s²),  = initial velocity (m/s) and  = angle made by the projectile with the horizontal axis.

2. Time of flight: this is the total time taken for the projectile to fall back to the same plane from which it was projected.

3. Maximum Height: this is the maximum height attained by the projectile OR the maximum displacement on the vertical axis (y-axis) covered by the projectile.

4. Range: The Range of a projectile is the horizontal distance covered (on the x-axis) by the projectile. Mathematically, . The Range is maximum when angle  = 45°, i.e. .

See also
 Atlatl
 Ballistics
 Gunpowder
 Bullet
 Impact depth
 Kinetic bombardment
 Shell (projectile)
 Projectile point
 Projectile use by animals
 Arrow
 Dart
 Missile
 Sling ammunition
 Spear
 Torpedo
 Range of a projectile
 Space debris
 Trajectory of a projectile

Notes

References

External links

  Open Source Physics computer model
 Projectile Motion Applet
 Another projectile Motion Applet

 
Ammunition
Ballistics